AS 12, AS-12, AS.12, etc. may refer to:
SS.12/AS.12, a missile
AS-12 Kegler, a missile
AS-12, Russian submarine Losharik
USS Sperry (AS-12)
Schleicher ASW 12